The 1905–06 Northern Football League season was the seventeenth in the history of the Northern Football League, a football competition in Northern England.

A Championship Match between the Professional Champions, Sunderland A, and the Amateur Champions, Bishop Auckland, was played on 28 April 1906. The match was a 1–1 draw.

Clubs

The league featured 13 clubs which competed in the last season, along with one new club: 
 Spennymoor United

League table

Championship match
28 April 1906: Sunderland A 1–1 Bishop Auckland

References

1905-06
North